Arlington is a home rule-class city in Carlisle County, Kentucky, in the United States. The population was 324 at the 2010 census, a drop from 395 in 2000. It was formally incorporated by the state assembly in 1876.

History

Arlington was founded in 1873 as a stop along a predecessor line of the Illinois Central Railroad. The new city was initially known as "Neville" after Robert Buckner Neville, who owned the land on which it was established. Several developers wanted to rename the city "Holtsville" after local store owner Tom Holt.  To prevent a dispute, the railroad settled on the name "Arlington" after Arlington Heights, Virginia, the hometown of a railroad official. The new city was incorporated in 1876.

When Carlisle County was created in 1886, Arlington was initially selected as the seat of the new county.  The nearby city of Bardwell challenged this, however, noting its more central location within the county. County officials agreed, and moved the seat to Bardwell shortly afterward.

Geography
U.S. Route 51 and Kentucky Route 80 intersect in the city. KY 80 leads west  to Columbus on the Mississippi River and east  to Mayfield.

Demographics

As of the census of 2000, there were 395 people, 189 households, and 109 families residing in the city. The racial makeup of the city was 95.19% White, 4.56% African American, and 0.25% from two or more races. Hispanic or Latino of any race were 1.01% of the population.

There were 189 households, out of which 22.8% had children under the age of 18 living with them, 40.2% were married couples living together, 12.7% had a female householder with no husband present, and 42.3% were non-families. 39.2% of all households were made up of individuals, and 23.8% had someone living alone who was 65 years of age or older. The average household size was 2.09 and the average family size was 2.77.

In the city, the population was spread out, with 21.0% under the age of 18, 6.1% from 18 to 24, 21.0% from 25 to 44, 27.3% from 45 to 64, and 24.6% who were 65 years of age or older. The median age was 46 years. For every 100 females, there were 82.0 males. For every 100 females age 18 and over, there were 77.3 males.

The median income for a household in the city was $17,813, and the median income for a family was $28,750. Males had a median income of $17,396 versus $15,833 for females. The per capita income for the city was $13,561. About 24.1% of families and 29.3% of the population were below the poverty line, including 41.5% of those under age 18 and 33.7% of those age 65 or over.

Notable residents
 George Harper, former Major League Baseball player who played for six teams

References

External links

Cities in Carlisle County, Kentucky
Cities in Kentucky